Boris Ivanovich Družinin (born 21 October 1938 in Sverdlovsk, Soviet Union) is a Russian-born Soviet and Lithuanian draughts player (International draughts),  referee, author of books on draughts. Honored Coach of the USSR.

Soldier of the USSR and Russia. As a player he was a champion of the USSR. In  Nizhny Tagil  founded the first USSR specialized children's and youth checker sports school. After that he lived for a long time in Ukraine (Sumy and Zaporozhye). Boris moved to Lithuania for permanent residence in 1990. He currently lives in Mažeikiai.

Academician of the St. Petersburg International Chess and Checkers Academy since 2002.

References

External links
 Pfofile, FMJD
 Lietuvos vyrų ir moterų braziliškų šaškių pirmenybės 2010
 Шашечный Израиль

1938 births
Living people
Lithuanian draughts players
Players of international draughts
Soviet draughts players
Sportspeople from Yekaterinburg
Lithuanian people of Russian descent